Funshion is a Chinese peer-to-peer streaming video network software and website. Target users are on the Chinese mainland. The vast majority of content is from East Asia, mostly Mainland China, Japan, Korea.

Company

Funshion Online was founded on September 28, 2005, and is headquartered in Beijing, China. The company is partnering with SMG's BesTV.

Applications
It provides TV programs and movies on demand stably and smoothly to broadband users. Funshion uses peer-to-peer streaming technology and supports high-volume traffic. There are 290 000 000 registered users, 60,000,000 daily users.

See also
PPLive
QQLive

External links
Official site 
English page
Weibo 
Spanish page

File sharing networks
Streaming television
Peercasting
Chinese brands
Peer-to-peer software